Devil on Horseback is a 1954 British sports drama film directed by Cyril Frankel and starring Googie Withers, John McCallum and Jeremy Spenser.  Its plot involves a boy who pursues his ambition to be a jockey. The screenplay was by Scottish writer Neil Paterson. It was made at Beaconsfield Studios with sets designed by Michael Stringer.

Cast

 Googie Withers as Mrs Cadell 
 John McCallum as Charles Roberts 
 Jeremy Spenser as Moppy Parfitt 
 Meredith Edwards as Ted Fellowes 
 Liam Redmond as Scarlett O'Hara 
 Sam Kydd as Darky 
 Bill Shine as Steward 
 Lucy Griffiths as Maid
 Brian Oulton as Villiers
 Malcolm Knight as Squib 
 Peter Lindsay as Len 
 Eric Francis as Reg Guest 
 Vic Wise as Fred Cole 
 Peter Swanwick as Mr Parfitt 
 Betty Hardy as Mrs Parfitt 
 Roger Maxwell as Chief Steward
 Arthur Lovegrove as Valet 
 Tom Walls Jr. as 	Starter 
 Frederick Piper as 	Miner
 Harry Locke as Lorry Driver
 Tony Sympson as	Musician
 Dudley Jones as Publican
 Lucy Griffiths as Maid
 George Rose as Blacksmith

Critical reception
Leonard Maltin called it an "inconsequential racing yarn" ; the Radio Times said, "it's strong on atmosphere and story. Sadly, the film suffers from lack of pace, disappointing racing sequences and an overdose of sentimentality" ; but TV Guide called it a "good racetrack drama, with excellent performances all around."

References

Bibliography
 Harper, Sue & Porter, Vincent. British Cinema of the 1950s: The Decline of Deference. Oxford University Press, 2007.

External links

1954 films
1950s sports drama films
Films directed by Cyril Frankel
British sports drama films
British horse racing films
Films shot at Beaconsfield Studios
Films set in England
1954 drama films
British Lion Films films
1950s English-language films
British black-and-white films
1950s British films